is a passenger railway station located in the city of Takamatsu, Kagawa Prefecture, Japan. It is operated by JR Shikoku and has the station number "Y02".

Lines
The station is served by the JR Shikoku Yosan Line and is located 6.1 km from the beginning of the line at Takamatsu. Yosan line local, Rapid Sunport, and Nanpū Relay services stop at the station. These trains also stop at Kinashi.

Layout
Kinashi Station consists of two opposed side platforms serving two tracks. Access to the opposite platform is by means of a footbridge. Parking is available at the station forecourt. The station's ticket window is unstaffed but a Chinese restaurant in the station building acts as a kan'i itaku agent and sells some types of tickets.

Adjacent stations

History
After the railway as nationalized on 1 December 1906, Japanese Government Railways (JGR) took over the station and operated it as part of the Sanuki Line (later the Sanyo and then the Yosan Main Line). With the privatization of Japanese National Railways (JNR, the successor of JGR) on 1 April 1987, control of the station passed to JR Shikoku.

Surrounding area
Takamatsu Municipal Kinashi Elementary School
Kagawa Prefectural Takamatsu Nishi High School
Kagawa Seiryo Junior and Senior High School

See also
 List of railway stations in Japan

References

External links

 Station timetable

Railway stations in Japan opened in 1897
Railway stations in Takamatsu